Réjean Cloutier (born February 15, 1960) is a former professional ice hockey player who played for the Detroit Red Wings in the National Hockey League.

Cloutier was born in Windsor, Quebec.

Career statistics

External links
 

1960 births
Living people
Adirondack Red Wings players
Brûleurs de Loups players
Canadian ice hockey defencemen
Detroit Red Wings players
Ice hockey people from Quebec
Nova Scotia Oilers players
People from Windsor, Quebec
Saginaw Generals players
SC Riessersee players
Sherbrooke Canadiens players
Sherbrooke Castors players
Undrafted National Hockey League players